Martin Howard (1725–1781) was a politician in colonial Rhode Island.  An eminent lawyer, politician, phisiocrat and sceptical philosopher, and had been a delegate from Rhode Island to the Albany Congress. He was the only prominent American to publicly support the Stamp Act of 1765, in his pamphlet "A Letter from a Gentleman at Halifax to His Friend in Rhode Island," (1765) in which he asserted that Parliament had the power to impose taxes on the colonies.  Fleeing Rhode Island, he was appointed Chief Justice of North Carolina (1767–1775).  A Loyalist, he returned to England when the Revolution broke out.

Howard was born probably in 1725 and grew up in Rhode Island where his family had moved in 1726. Although raised a Baptist, he became active in the Anglican Church in Newport. Elected to the assembly in 1756, he served on the committee that revised the colony's laws in 1760.

In 1765, Howard was appointed by the Crown, jointly with Dr. Moffatt and Augustus Johnson, stamp masters for Rhode Island. They came under attack and their houses were burned. Tax protesters carried his effigy through the streets, hoisting it 15 feet high with a noose around the neck. Howard fled to England and was rewarded by the Crown with an appointment as Chief Justice of North Carolina at a salary of £1000.

Further reading
 Bailyn, Bernard, ed., Pamphlets of the American Revolution, 1750-1776, vol. 1 (1965) for the text of Howard's pamphlet
 Jensen, Merrill, ed. Tracts of the American Revolution, 1763-1776 (2003) p 63, for another copy
 Higginbotham, Don, and William S. Price, Jr., eds., "Was It Murder for a White Man to Kill a Slave? Chief Justice Martin Howard Condemns the Peculiar Institution in North Carolina," William and Mary Quarterly 36 (Oct. 1979).
 Yancey, Noel. "Howard, Martin" in American National Biography Online 2000. Access Date: Wed Sep 14 2018

References

1725 births
1781 deaths
American judges
Loyalists in the American Revolution from Rhode Island
Members of the North-Carolina Provincial Council
American librarians